1779 Paraná, provisional designation , is an asteroid from the inner regions of the asteroid belt, approximately 4 kilometers in diameter.

The asteroid was discovered on 15 June 1950, by Argentine astronomer Miguel Itzigsohn at the La Plata Astronomical Observatory in La Plata, capital of the province of Buenos Aires. It was named for the Paraná River in South America.

Orbit and classification 

Paraná orbits the Sun in the inner main-belt at a distance of 1.8–2.5 AU once every 3 years and 3 months (1,172 days). Its orbit has an eccentricity of 0.16 and an inclination of 1° with respect to the ecliptic.

As no precoveries were taken, and no prior identifications were made, Paranás observation arc begins with its official discovery observation in 1950. Paraná has also been cataloged by the Palomar–Leiden survey and received the survey designation  (PLS6116).

Physical characteristics

Diameter and albedo 

According to the survey carried out by NASA's Wide-field Infrared Survey Explorer with its subsequent NEOWISE mission, Paraná measures 4.09 kilometers in diameter and its surface has an albedo of 0.221. Based on a magnitude-to-diameter conversion, using an albedo in the range of 0.05 to 0.25 and a magnitude of 14.1, the asteroid's generic diameter is between 4 and 9 kilometers.

Rotation period 

As of 2017, Paranás spectral type, rotation period and shape remain unknown.

Naming 

This minor planet was named for a large and 4,880-kilometers long Paraná River that runs through northern Argentina, Brazil and Paraguay. It is a major tributary to the La Plata river, where the city of La Plata and the discovering observatory are located (also see 1029 La Plata). The official naming citation was published by the Minor Planet Center on 8 April 1982.

References

External links 
 Asteroid Lightcurve Database (LCDB), query form (info )
 Dictionary of Minor Planet Names, Google books
 Asteroids and comets rotation curves, CdR – Observatoire de Genève, Raoul Behrend
 Discovery Circumstances: Numbered Minor Planets (1)-(5000) – Minor Planet Center
 
 

001779
Discoveries by Miguel Itzigsohn
Named minor planets
6116
19500615